The Sri Lanka Media Training Institute (SLMTI) is an autonomous establishment under the Ministry of Mass Media and Information.  It was founded in   1984; as the Sri Lankan Television Training Institute to train professionals in the field of television. The institute was run in collaboration with Friedrich Ebert Stiftung (FES) of Bonn, Federal Republic of Germany, Sri Lanka Rupavahini Corporation (SLRC), and Sri Lanka Foundation Institute (SLFI). At present as the SLMTI the institute has widened its mandate to offers certificates, Diplomas and higher Diplomas in all disciplines related to Mass Media. The Chairman of SLMTI is Dr. Dharmasena Pathiraja  who is a Sri Lankan film director, screenwriter and an academic.

Courses offered by SLMTI

Certificate Courses
 Certificate in Camera And Lighting Techniques
 Certificate in Non-Linear Video Editing
 Certificate Course in TV Program Production
 Certificate in Web Designing & Development
 TV Presentation & News Reading
 Certificate in Radio Announcing And Production
 Certificate in 3d Animation
 Digital Non-Linear Video Editing (Final Cut Pro)

DIPLOMA COURSES
 Advanced Diploma in Digital Postproduction Technology
 Diploma in Journalism
 Diploma in Film Directing Technology and Aesthetic
 Diploma in Digital Cinematography
 Diploma in English for Media

Facilities
RECORDING STUDIO : Studio Area 150 sq. meter

SLMTI has a recording studio. This studio fulfills the internal training requirements as well as the recording needs of external bodies.

References

Mass media in Sri Lanka
Colleges in Sri Lanka